This is a list of ministers from Prem Singh Tamang cabinet starting from 27 May 2019.

Tamang is the leader of Sikkim Krantikari Morcha, who was sworn in as the 6th Chief Minister of Sikkim on 27 May 2019.

Council of Ministers

See also 

 Government of Sikkim
 Sikkim Legislative Assembly

References

2019 in Indian politics
Sikkim ministries
Lists of current Indian state and territorial ministries
2019 establishments in Sikkim
Cabinets established in 2019